Jack Edward Bowsher (October 2, 1930 – April 8, 2006) was an American race car driver and car owner. He obtained more than ten national championships in his 58-year racing career including, three ARCA Championships. He is also the father of 2-time ARCA Champion Bobby Bowsher.

Early life
Jack Edward Bowsher was born on October 2, 1930, in Harmony, Ohio. He graduated from Plattsburg High School in 1948 and served a year in the Navy in 1949.

Career
Bowsher began his racing career in 1949 after attending his first race. In 1953 Jack joined the newly sanctioned ARCA Series. In 1963 Jack accumulated 16 wins on his way to win his first ARCA Title. Bowsher went on to win the championship the next two years. In 1971 Bowsher competed in the USAC Stock Car Series finishing 2nd in the series standings. He accumulated 21 wins in the series. As an owner Bowsher won five ARCA titles (three while driving for himself and two with his son Bobby driving). He also won a USAC Title in 1968 with A. J. Foyt driving. Bowsher and Foyt were among the first drivers to test stock cars at the Indianapolis Motor Speedway in the late 1960s. Bowsher's Ford won the 1976 24 Hours of Daytona in the stock car class. 

Bowsher was the first person to build a down-tube open-wheel modified race car. This became a standard in modern open wheel racing. In 1988 Bowsher returned to the ARCA series as an owner for his son Bobby. The father son duo produced 17 victories on the way to two national titles.

In 1989, a month shy of his 59th birthday, Bowsher, who had not driven in a decade, reluctantly stepped out of retirement subbing for defending ARCA champion Tracy Leslie on the Springfield Mile Dirt Oval where he won the pole and finished 10th in the race on the lead lap. His other son Todd is currently prevalent in the ARCA Series.

Death
On April 8, 2006, Bowsher died. He is survived by wife Julie Bowsher, and sons Jack Bowsher, Jr., Gary Bowsher, Jim Bowsher, Bobby Bowsher, Todd Bowsher and daughter Jodie Bowsher.

See also
 Bowsher Racing
 Legends of NASCAR Article

References

External links

Ultimate Racing History Profile
The Third Turn Profile

1930 births
2006 deaths
Sportspeople from Springfield, Ohio
Racing drivers from Ohio
24 Hours of Daytona drivers
ARCA Menards Series drivers
United States Navy sailors
USAC Stock Car drivers